The Third Dikshit cabinet was the Council of Ministers in fourth Delhi Legislative Assembly headed by Chief Minister Sheila Dikshit.

Council members
 Ashok Kumar Walia
 Arvinder Singh Lovely - Urban Development & Revenue, Education, Transport, Tourism, Languages, Gurudwara Election, Local Bodies & Gurudwara Administration
 Kiran Walia - Health and Family welfare Department, Women & Child Development and languages
 Ramakant Goswami - Transport
 Haroon Yusuf - Food & Civil Supplies and Industries
 Yoganand Shastri
 Raj Kumar Chauhan - Development, Revenue, Irrigation & Flood Control, Public Works, SC/ST Welfare

Former members

References

Cabinets established in 2008
2008 establishments in Delhi
Delhi cabinets
Indian National Congress state ministries
2013 disestablishments in India
Cabinets disestablished in 2013